Bukovinian Subcarpathians (Obcinele Bucovinei) is a geographic area in the NNE of Romania (Suceava County) and SWW of Ukraine (Chernivtsi Oblast), situated to the east and north-east of the Eastern Carpathian Mountains. It is a subunit of the Eastern Carpathian Foothills.

The Bukovinian Subcarpathians are bounded by the Suceava Plateau on the low side, and the Eastern Carpathian Mountains on the upper side.

The area consists of:
  (Obcina Brodina). Highest peak: , .
  (Obcina Curmătura). Highest peak: Chicera Neagră, .
  (Obcina Feredeu). Highest peak: Veju Mare, .
  (Obcina Humor) 
  (Obcina Mare). Highest peaks: ,  and Scorușețu Peak, .
 Obcina Mestecăniș Mountains (Obcina Mestecăniș). Highest peak: , .
  (Obcina Moldovița). Highest peak: Bobeica Peak, .
  (Obcina Șurdin). Highest peak: , .

See also
 Outer Subcarpathia
 Divisions of the Carpathians

External links

Regions of Europe
Geography of Romania
Geography of Chernivtsi Oblast
Carpathian Foothills